The 1983 Ole Miss Rebels football team represented the University of Mississippi in the sport of American football during the 1983 NCAA Division I-A football season. It was the first year for head coach Billy Brewer.

Schedule

Personnel

Season summary

Mississippi State

"The Immaculate Deflection" - Artie Crosby missed a 27-yard field goal attempt with 24 seconds left when 40 mile-per-hour winds knocked down the football before it could pass the crossbar.

Ole Miss received a bid to play in the Independence Bowl.

References

Ole Miss
Ole Miss Rebels football seasons
Ole Miss Rebels football